Stanley Joseph Hunt (July 28, 1894 – November 23, 1965) was a Canadian politician who was a Member of Provincial Parliament in Legislative Assembly of Ontario from 1943 to 1958. He represented the riding of Renfrew North for the Ontario Progressive Conservative Party.

He was born in Renfrew County, Ontario and was a farmer.  He died in 1965.

References

External links

1894 births
1965 deaths
Progressive Conservative Party of Ontario MPPs